Agustín Mario Cejas (22 March 1945 – 14 August 2015) was an Argentine football goalkeeper. He played for a number of clubs in Argentina and Brazil and has the all-time record number of appearances for Racing Club de Avellaneda.

Cejas joined the Racing Club youth team in 1959 at the age of 13. He made his first team debut in 1962 at the age of 17. In 1966, he helped Racing Club to win the Argentine Primera. The following year Racing won the Copa Libertadores 1967 to become Libertadores champions of South America for the only time in the club's history. They followed this up by beating Celtic F.C. in the Copa Intercontinental to become the first Argentine club champions of the world.

In 1970, Cejas joined Santos in Brazil where he played in the same team as Pelé. In 1973, Cejas helped Santos to win the Campeonato Paulista and received the prestigious Bola de Ouro as the best player in Brazil.

Cejas returned to Argentina in 1975 for a brief spell with Club Atlético Huracán before going back to Brazil to join Grêmio.

In 1977, Cejas returned to Racing Club where he played until 1980. By the end of his second period with the club he had set a club record of 313 appearances. He then had a short spell with River Plate where he was part of the squad that won the Nacional in 1981.

Cejas played for Argentina at the 1964 Summer Olympics.

Agustín Cejas died of Alzheimer's disease on 14 August 2015.

Titles

References

External links

 
 
 

1945 births
2015 deaths
Footballers from Buenos Aires
Argentine footballers
Argentina international footballers
Argentine expatriate footballers
Association football goalkeepers
Argentine Primera División players
Campeonato Brasileiro Série A players
Racing Club de Avellaneda footballers
Santos FC players
Club Atlético Huracán footballers
Grêmio Foot-Ball Porto Alegrense players
Club Atlético River Plate footballers
Olympic footballers of Argentina
Footballers at the 1964 Summer Olympics
Expatriate footballers in Brazil
Argentine expatriate sportspeople in Brazil
Deaths from dementia in Argentina
Deaths from Alzheimer's disease
Pan American Games medalists in football
Pan American Games silver medalists for Argentina
Footballers at the 1963 Pan American Games
Medalists at the 1963 Pan American Games